The 2006 FIA GT Brno 500 km was the second race for the 2006 FIA GT Championship season.  It took place on May 28, 2006.

Official results

Class winners in bold.  Cars failing to complete 70% of winner's distance marked as Not Classified (NC).

Statistics
 Pole Position – #9 Zakspeed Racing – 1:55.660
 Average Speed – 158.15 km/h

External links
 Official Results

B